Amandine du 38, or Miss Amanda, is a French amateur singer, whose rap videos went viral in January 2009. She then decided to stop uploading videos and quit studying because of the heavy harassment, but changed her mind in March 2010 and tried to release a crowdfunded album under the name Miss Sing.

The buzz 
In December 2008, Amandine du 38, 18 years old, uploaded a rap video online called École au Sénégal (school in Senegal), dealing with the poverty in Senegal. Using the artist name Miss Amanda, she wanted to show what she is able to do and get tips to improve. However, her amateurish rap, slaughtering the French language, was noticed by the radio show le 6/9 from NRJ and went viral in January 2009, under the name "Amandine du 38" that she never chose. She then became a victim of harassment (teasing, insults, death threats, suicide rumors) whether at school, on the Internet or at her home.
 Many videos were published online to clash her, urged by French radio stations such as NRJ, Ado FM or the regional radio RMG 38. Although her school and her parents advised her to stop sharing videos, especially since her sister and brother were also being harassed at school, she kept on uploading new songs as well as clash videos to answer her harassers. A few months later, fed up with being asked to rap between classes, she finally gave up making videos for a few months and dropped out of school.
in 2014 she also collaborated with SILLAZ on the single swag attitude, sillaz helped her to become less ridiculous and tried to bring back her career where she left it in 2010.

Attempt to release an album 
In March 2010, Amandine du 38 came back with new songs under the name Miss Sing. She tried to release an album in the crowdfunding record label MyMajorCompany, but failed to reach the required amount. She was still being harassed online, as many of her online accounts were hacked, but stated that she doesn't really know if she regrets publishing her first video and wants to buzz again to be happy. She resumed her studies in October 2014.

Posterity 
Amandine du 38 was still mentioned in 2021 as an example of ridiculous rap and quick virtual notoriety despite lacking any musical talent.

References

Living people
Viral videos
Victims of cyberbullying
Year of birth missing (living people)
Place of birth missing (living people)
French women rappers